Holmgren is a Swedish surname. Notable people with the surname include:

Alarik Frithiof Holmgren (1831–1897), Swedish physiologist
Ann-Margret Holmgren (1850–1940), Swedish historian and feminist
August Emil Holmgren (1829–1888), Swedish entomologist
Börje Holmgren (1909–1990), Swedish curler
Chet Holmgren (born 2002), American basketball player
David Holmgren, Australian ecological design engineer and writer
Erik Albert Holmgren, Swedish mathematician.
Erik Holmgren,  Finnish football defender  
Gary Holmgren, American retired light middleweight professional boxer 
Gathania Holmgren, Swedish pop singer 
Herman Teodor Holmgren (1842–1914), Swedish architect 
Israel Holmgren (1871–1961), Swedish scientist, physician and professor
Jan Holmgren (born 1944), Swedish physician and medical researcher 
Janet L. Holmgren, American college administrator and president of Mills College 
Leif Holmgren, Swedish ice hockey player
Mike Holmgren (born 1948), American professional football coach 
Nils Frithiof Holmgren (1877-1954) Swedish zoologist 
Paul Holmgren, American professional ice hockey player 
Rolf Holmgren, Swedish actor and scriptwriter

See also
Holmgren's uniqueness theorem, in the theory of partial differential equations, named after Erik Albert Holmgren

Swedish-language surnames